Whatevershebringswesing is the third solo album by Kevin Ayers, on Harvest Records.

Background

In 1971, Kevin Ayers started recording what would become his most acclaimed album, Whatevershebringswesing accompanied by members of Gong and his previous backing band The Whole World. Praised by NME, Record Mirror and Rolling Stone, the album realized all the musical aspirations Ayers had harboured since the inception of Soft Machine.

As with most Ayers albums, a collision of disparate styles confronts the listener but in this instance they work to extremely powerful effect. The title track with Mike Oldfield's guitar accompaniment and Robert Wyatt's wracked harmonies would become a template for Ayers subsequent '70s output.

The album opens with "There Is Loving/Among Us" accompanied by David Bedford's dramatic orchestral arrangement. There follow the vignettes "Margaret" and "Oh My" where Ayers juxtaposes terse lyrics against measured backing. "Song from the Bottom of a Well" marries an explosive arrangement, again featuring Oldfield, to Ayers' cryptic lyric "This is a song from the bottom of a well / There are things down here / I've got to try and tell". The title track is notable for Oldfield's extended bass solo at the beginning, while "Stranger in Blue Suede Shoes", a flirtation with Ayers' love of early rock and roll, would become a staple of his live set for years to come, a song he would re-record twice that decade.

Many critics and fans have cited Whatevershebringswesing as their favourite Ayers album and it remains to this day a best seller in his catalogue.

Track listing

Personnel

Musicians
 Kevin Ayers – vocals, guitar, bass (track 6)
 David Bedford – keyboards, orchestral arrangements
 Mike Oldfield – bass (tracks 1, 3–5), guitar (tracks 5, 7, 9)
 Dave Dufort – drums (tracks 1, 4–5)
 William Murray – percussion (tracks 2–3, 7)
 Tony Carr – drums (tracks 6, 12)
 Robert Wyatt – harmony vocals (track 5)
 Didier Malherbe – saxophone (track 1), flute (track 8)
 Gerry Fields – violin (track 3)
 Johnny Van Derrick– violin (tracks 2, 7)
 Bruce Malamut – flugelhorns (track 1), incidental brass (tracks 1–2, 5–6, 8, 12), assistant engineer (tracks 1–2)

Technical
 Andrew King – producer
 Kevin Ayers – producer
 Peter Mews – engineer
 John Barrett – engineer
 Adrian Boot – design
 Adrian Lyne – photography

Notes

References
 Live Review by Richard Williams (Melody Maker, 18 April 1970)
 Album review (NME, January 1972)
 Album review by Alain Dister (Rock & Folk, June 1972)
 Album review (Sounds, 25 January 1972)
 Album review (Record Mirror, January 1972)
 Album review (Rolling Stone, June 1972)
Everything You Do Is True, As Long As You Believe It – Whatevershebringswesing sleevenotes by Martin Wakeling (Harvest, September 2006)

1971 albums
Kevin Ayers albums
Harvest Records albums
Albums produced by Kevin Ayers